Datong east railway station is a station of Jingbao Railway in Datong City, Shanxi.

See also

List of stations on Jingbao railway

Railway stations in Shanxi